Bryan Lasme (born 14 November 1998) is a French professional footballer who plays as a winger or forward for 2. Bundesliga club Arminia Bielefeld.

Club career
Lasme signed his first professional contract with FC Sochaux-Montbéliard on 24 January 2017. He made his professional debut for Sochaux in a 3–3 Ligue 2 tie with Clermont Foot on 20 January 2017.

In September 2018, Lasme was loaned to Championnat National side SO Cholet for the 2018–19 season.

International career
Lasme received a call-up to represent the France national under-20 football team for the 2018 Toulon Tournament on 17 May 2018.

References

External links
 
 
 
 

1998 births
Living people
People from Montauban
French footballers
Footballers from Occitania (administrative region)
Association football forwards
France youth international footballers
FC Sochaux-Montbéliard players
SO Cholet players
Ligue 2 players
Bundesliga players
Championnat National players
Montauban FCTG players
Arminia Bielefeld players
Sportspeople from Tarn-et-Garonne
French expatriate footballers
French expatriate sportspeople in Germany
Expatriate footballers in Germany